Furethidine is a 4-phenylpiperidine derivative that is related to the clinically used opioid analgesic drug pethidine (meperidine), but with around 25x higher potency. According to another source, Furethidine is 500/30 = 16.7 x the potency of pethidine (table VII).

Furethidine is not currently used in medicine and is a Class A/Schedule I drug which is controlled under UN drug conventions. It has similar effects to other opioid derivatives, such as analgesia, sedation, nausea and respiratory depression. In the United States it is a Schedule I Narcotic controlled substance with the ACSCN of 9626.

References

External links 
 UNODC Bulletin on Narcotics 1961

Synthetic opioids
Tetrahydrofurans
4-Phenylpiperidines
Carboxylate esters
Ethyl esters
Mu-opioid receptor agonists